Asi or ASI may refer to:

Asi
 Asi, a Russian name for the Ossetians
 Asi, another name for the Orontes River
 Asi language, a language spoken in Southern Philippines, mainly in the islands comprising the province of Romblon
 Asi, Creek language for the black drink brewed by Native Americans of the Southeastern United States
 Así, album by Benny Ibarra
 Asi (Mahabharata), a sword in the Sanskrit epic poem Mahabharata
 Asi (TV series), a Turkish TV series
Asi Taulava (born 1973), Filipino-Tongan professional basketball player

Acronyms

Technology
 AS-Interface (written "AS-i"), or Actuator Sensor Interface, a type of fieldbus
 Airspeed indicator
 Asynchronous serial interface, standardised transport interface for the broadcast industry
 Advanced Switching Interconnect, a peer-to-peer enhancement of PCI Express
 Area-specific impedance, a measure of Acoustic impedance
 Automatic Semicolon Insertion in JavaScript
 Artificial superintelligence
 Autonomous Solutions, Inc., technology company

Organizations
 Adam Smith Institute, a neoliberal think tank in the United Kingdom
 Advertising Specialty Institute, an American company serving the advertising specialty industry
 American Share Insurance, a private deposit insurer
 Animals & Society Institute, a scholarly society for human-animal studies
 Anthropological Survey of India, agency for anthropological studies of India
 Applied Spectral Imaging, a biomedical company
 Archaeological Survey of India, agency for archaeological research and preservation in India
 Artemis Society International, a 1990s lunar colonization effort connected to the Moon Society
 Agenzia Spaziale Italiana (Italian Space Agency)
 Asian Social Institute, a social sciences research institute and graduate school in Manila, the Philippines
 American Strategic Insurance, an American insurance company

Other uses
 Ancestral South Indian, in genetics and archaeogenetics of South Asia
 Anjuman Serfaroshan-e-Islam
 Anti-suit injunction, a legal injunction
 Arrêt sur images, a French television program
 Assistant Sub-Inspector of Police, a rank in the Indian police
 RAF Ascension Island (IATA airport code ASI)

See also 
 Asia
Asia (disambiguation)